La Argentina is a town and municipality in the Huila Department, Colombia.

External links
 La Argentina official website

References

Municipalities of Huila Department